The Cichorieae (also called Lactuceae) are a tribe in the plant family Asteraceae that includes 93 genera, more than 1,600 sexually reproductive species and more than 7,000 apomictic species. They are found primarily in temperate regions of the Eastern Hemisphere. Cichorieae all have milky latex and flowerheads that only contain one type of floret. The genera Gundelia and Warionia only have disk florets, while all other genera only have ligulate florets. The genera that contain most species are Taraxacum (Crepidinae subtribe) with about 1,600 apomictic species, Hieracium with about 770 sexually reproducing and 5,200 apomictic species, and Pilosella with 110 sexually reproducing and 700 apomictic species (both Hieraciinae). Well-known members include lettuce, chicory, dandelion, and salsify.

Description 
Most species are herbaceous, perennial, short-lived or annual plants, rarely subshrubs, shrubs or vines. All Cichorieae-species have latex canals in both the roots, stems and leaves, and this occurs to be a unique character among the Asteraceae, although latex as such occurs rather widespread in this family. The leaves are in a rosette or alternately set along the stem, but this is the dominant situation in the Asteraceae. The only exception in the Cichorieae are the opposite lower leaves of Shinnersoseris. Traditionally, the Cichorieae consisted of taxa with flowerheads only containing bisexual ligulate florets (having a strap-shaped corolla with five teeth at its tip), a rare character that is further present only in the genera Catamixis, Glossarion, Hyaloseris (Mutisieae), and Fitchia (Heliantheae). However, recently the genera Gundelia and Warionia have been included in the Cichorieae, and those two genera have heads containing only disk flowers.

Taxonomy 
In his Elemens de botanique ou methode pour connoître les plantes of 1694, Joseph Pitton de Tournefort first described this group as a taxonomic unit, calling it the "13th class of the plant kingdom". He only assigned taxa to it that are still regarded part of the Cichorieae today. Sébastien Vaillant gave this group the name "Cichoracées" in 1723. Since the name predates the start of the Linnean nomenclature in 1753, it is not valid, but Jean-Baptiste Lamarck and Augustin Pyramus de Candolle used the name Cichorieae in the Synopsis Plantarium in Flora Gallica Descriptarum, published in 1806. The name Lactuceae that was coined by Henri Cassini in 1819, comprises the same group of taxa and is thus a synonym. Obviously, over the centuries since the group was first identified, numerous new taxa have been described that are now included in the Cichorieae, and the group has been divided in different subgroups using various morphological character states by authors such as Cassini, David Don, Christian Friedrich Lessing, A.P. De Candolle, George Bentham and Karl August Otto Hoffmann.

Phylogeny 
Genetic analysis has increased the insight in the phylogenetic relationships between the Cichorieae. The following trees together represent those insights.

Subtribes

Basal subtribes

Chondrillinae, Crepidinae, Hyoseridinae, Hypochaeridinae, Lactucinae

Cichoriinae, Hieraciinae and Microseridinae

Alphabetic list of genera 

 Acanthocephalus
 Actites
 Agoseris
 Andryala
 Anisocoma
 Aposeris
 Arnoseris
 Atrichoseris
 Calycoseris
 Catananche
 Cephalorrhynchus
 Chaetadelpha
 Chaetoseris
 Chlorocrepis
 Chondrilla
 Chorisis
 Cicerbita
 Cichorium
 Crepidiastrum
 Crepis
 Dendroseris
 Dubyaea
 Embergeria
 Epilasia
 Erythroseris
 Faberia
 Faberiopsis
 Garhadiolus
 Geropogon
 Glyptopleura
 Gundelia
 Hedypnois
 Helminthotheca
 Heteracia
 Heteroderis
 Hexinia
 Hieracium
 Hispidella
 Hymenonema
 Hyoseris
 Hypochaeris
 Ixeridium
 Ixeris
 Kirkianella
 Koelpinia
 Krigia
 Lactuca
 Lagedium
 Lapsana
 Lapsanastrum
 Lasiospora
 Launaea
 Leontodon
 Lygodesmia
 Malacothrix
 Marshalljohnstonia
 Microseris
 Mulgedium
 Munzothamnus
 Mycelis
 Nabalus
 Nothocalais
 Notoseris
 Paraixeris
 Paramicrorhynchus
 Paraprenanthes
 Parasyncalathium 
 Phalacroseris
 Phitosia
 Picris
 Pilosella
 Pinaropappus
 Pleiacanthus
 Podospermum
 Prenanthella
 Prenanthes
 Pterachaenia
 Pterocypsela
 Pyrrhopappus
 Rafinesquia
 Reichardia
 Rhagadiolus
 Rothmaleria
 Scariola
 Scolymus
 Scorzonera
 Scorzoneroides
 Shinnersoseris
 Sonchus
 Soroseris
 Stebbinsia
 Stebbinsoseris
 Stenoseris
 Stephanomeria
 Steptorhamphus
 Syncalathium
 Takhtajaniantha
 Taraxacum
 Thamnoseris
 Tolpis
 Tourneuxia
 Tragopogon
 Uropappus
 Urospermum
 Warionia
 Willemetia
 Youngia

References

External links 

 International Cichorieae Network

 
Asteraceae tribes